The senior men's tournament at the 2016 FIRS World Inline Hockey Championships was the 21st event hosted by the Comité International de Roller In-Line Hockey (CIRILH), an organization and discipline of the Fédération Internationale de Roller Sports (FIRS), held in Asiago and Roana, Veneto region, Italy, between June 20–25, 2016.

The Czech Republic won the team's fifth title in history by defeating Italy in the final 4–0.

Locations

Format
Twenty-three team were divided into six pools. The top eight teams, based on final placement of the 2015 competition, were placed into Pools A and B, each with four teams. The remaining fifteen teams were divided into Pools C, D, E and F one with three teams and the other with four. The teams then played a round-robin within their pools. The best three teams in pools A and B, as well as the top team in pools C, D, E and F, advanced to a single-knockout playoff for the world championship. The remaining teams advanced to the single-knockout for other placement.

Nations

Asia
 
 
 
 
 
Europe
 
 
 
 
 
 
 
 
 
 
 
Oceania
 
Pan-America

Rosters

Each team's roster consisted of at least six skaters (forwards and defencemen) and two goaltenders, and at most 14 skaters and two goaltenders. All twenty-three participating nations, through the confirmation of their respective national associations, had to submit a roster the sign-in date of the tournament.

Seeding and pools
The seeding in the preliminary round is based on the 2015 World Championships. The teams were grouped according to seeding (in parenthesis is the corresponding 2015 placement). Top 8 placement was seeded in Level 1.

Level 1

Pool A
 (1)
 (4)
 (5)
 (8)

Pool B
 (2)
 (3)
 (6)
 (7)

Level 2 

Pool C
 (10)
 ‡ 2014
 ‡ 2007

Pool D
 (11)
 ‡ 2014
 ‡ 2014
 ‡ 2014

Pool E
 (12)
  ‡ 2014
  ‡ 2014
  ‡ 2014

Pool F
 (14)
 (15)
 ‡ 2011
 ‡ 2008

‡ Last participate championships.

Round robin

Pool A

All times are local (UTC+1).

Pool B

All times are local (UTC+1).

Pool C

Pool D

Pool E

Pool F

World Championship

 † Indicates overtime victory
 ‡ Indicates shootout victory

Pre-quarterfinals

Quarterfinals

Semifinals

Bronze medal game

Gold medal game

5th through 8th placement

All times are local (UTC+1).

5th place game

7th place game

9th through 16th placement

All times are local (UTC+1).

9th place game

11th place game

13th place game

15th place game

17th through 22nd placement

All times are local (UTC+1).

17th place game

19th place game

21st place game

Final ranking

See also 
 FIRS Inline Hockey World Championships
 List of FIRS Senior Men's Inline Hockey World Championships medalists

References

External links

FIRS World Championships
Inline hockey tournaments